The following are the national records in athletics in Ireland maintained by Athletics Association of Ireland (AAI)

Outdoor

Key to tables:

+ = en route to a longer distance

h = hand timing

A = affected by altitude

a = aided road course according to IAAF rule 260.28

Men

Women

Mixed

Indoor

Men

Women

Mixed

Notes

References
General
Irish Athletics Records - Men Outdoor 11 January 2023 updated
Irish Athletics Records - Women Outdoor 11 January 2023 updated
Irish Athletics Records - Men Indoor 11 January 2023 updated
Irish Athletics Records - Women Indoor 11 January 2023 updated
Irish Road Race records − Men
Irish Road Race records − Women
Specific

External links
 AAI web site
 AAI records page

Irish
Records
Athletics
Athletics